This is a list of rural localities in Lipetsk Oblast. Lipetsk Oblast (Lipetskaya oblast) is a federal subject of Russia (an oblast). Its administrative center is the city of Lipetsk. As of the 2010 Census, its population was 1,173,513.

Dankovsky District 
Rural localities in Dankovsky District:

 Avdulovo
 Polibino

Dobrinsky District 
Rural localities in Dobrinsky District:

 Dobrinka

Dobrovsky District 
Rural localities in Dobrovsky District:

 Dobroye

Dolgorukovsky District 
Rural localities in Dolgorukovsky District:

 Dolgorukovo

Gryazinsky District 
Rural localities in Gryazinsky District:

 Kazinka

Izmalkovsky District 
Rural localities in Izmalkovsky District:

 Izmalkovo

Khlevensky District 
Rural localities in Khlevensky District:

 Khlevnoye

Krasninsky District 
Rural localities in Krasninsky District:

 Krasnoye

Lev-Tolstovsky District 
Rural localities in Lev-Tolstovsky District:

 Lev Tolstoy

Lipetsky District 
Rural localities in Lipetsky District:

 Lenino
 Pruzhinki

Stanovlyansky District 
Rural localities in Stanovlyansky District:

 Stanovoye

Terbunsky District 
Rural localities in Terbunsky District:

 Terbuny

Volovsky District 
Rural localities in Volovsky District:

 Volovo

Yeletsky District 
Rural localities in Yeletsky District:

 Kazaki

Zadonsky District 
Rural localities in Zadonsky District:

 Donskoy Selsoviet
 Donskoye

See also 
 
 Lists of rural localities in Russia

References 

Lipetsk Oblast